Doncaster Mile may refer to:

Doncaster Handicap, a Group One horse race run at Randwick Racecourse, Australia
Doncaster Mile Stakes, a Listed horse race run at Doncaster Racecourse, England